The 1971 Christchurch mayoral election was part of the New Zealand local elections held that same year. In 1971, elections were held for the Mayor of Christchurch plus other local government positions. The polling was conducted using the standard first-past-the-post electoral method. The incumbent, Ron Guthrey of the Citizens' ticket, was defeated by the Labour Party candidate Neville Pickering.

Background
There were two hotly-discussed issues leading up to the 1971 election: a proposal by the mayor to build a road through North Hagley Park, and the venue choice for the 1974 British Commonwealth Games. Senior councillor Peter Skellerup of the Citizens' ticket criticised the incumbent mayor, Ron Guthrey (also of the Citizens' ticket) on the road proposal. According to Hamish Hay, a later mayor, the road proposal was Guthrey's undoing, and he was defeated by Labour councillor Neville Pickering. It was the first occasion in 46 years that a sitting mayor had been defeated. Labour won a majority on the city council as well, winning control of the council for the first time since 1956, resulting in the composition of the council at eleven seats to eight in favour of the Labour Party. The highest-polling councillor, by a margin of 2500 votes, was Skellerup, though.

Mayoralty results
The following table gives the election results:

 
 
 
 
 
 

This is the first time that Tubby Hansen stood for the Christchurch mayoralty. As of 2022, he has stood in every local election for the mayoralty since.

Councillor results

Aftermath
A local government commission recommended that Christchurch amalgamate with some of the small surrounding local authorities and the area be divided into wards for electoral purposes, with the mayor then the only position elected at large. Pickering promised during the election campaign that wards would be introduced for the 1974 local elections. The Citizens' ticket was also in favour of introducing wards but tied this to amalgamation going ahead. Amalgamation did not proceed but the Labour-led council introduced five wards in time for the 1974 local elections.

References

Mayoral elections in Christchurch
1971 elections in New Zealand
Politics of Christchurch
October 1971 events in New Zealand
1970s in Christchurch